Holman Francis Day (November 6, 1865 – February 19, 1935) was an American author, born at Vassalboro, Maine. The Holman Day House, his home Auburn, Maine, is listed on the National Register of Historic Places. His book The Rider of the King Log was adapted into the 1921 film The Rider of the King Log. His play Along Came Ruth was adapted into the 1924 film Along Came Ruth.

Personal life 
Day married Helen Gerald, the only daughter of railroad engineer Amos F. Gerald and Caroline W. Rowell. She died in 1902 at the age of 32, and was interred in Maplewood Cemetery in her father's home town of Fairfield, Maine; Day, meanwhile, was buried in Nichols Cemetery in his hometown of Vassalboro, Maine, upon his death in 1935.

Career 

He graduated from Colby College (class of 1887) and in 1889-90 he was managing editor of the publications of the Union Publishing Company in Bangor, Maine. He was also editor and proprietor of the Gazette in Dexter, Maine, a special writer for the  Journal in Lewiston, Maine, representative of the Boston Herald, and managing editor of the  Daily Sun in Lewiston. From 1901 until 1904 he was military secretary to Gov. John F. Hill of Maine.

He came to Carmel-by-the-Sea, California in the 1920s.

Works

References

External links 
 
 
 

1865 births
1935 deaths
20th-century American novelists
Colby College alumni
People from Vassalboro, Maine
People from Dexter, Maine
20th-century American poets
20th-century American dramatists and playwrights
American male novelists
American male poets
American male dramatists and playwrights
20th-century American male writers